The generalized logistic function or curve is an extension of the logistic or sigmoid functions. Originally developed for growth modelling, it allows for more flexible S-shaped curves. The function is sometimes named Richards's curve after F. J. Richards, who proposed the general form for the family of models in 1959.

Definition
Richards's curve has the following form:

where  = weight, height, size etc., and  = time. It has five parameters:
: the lower (left) asymptote;
: the upper (right) asymptote when . If  and  then  is called the carrying capacity;
: the growth rate;
 : affects near which asymptote maximum growth occurs.
: is related to the value 
: typically takes a value of 1. Otherwise, the upper asymptote is 

The equation can also be written:

Including both  and  can be convenient:

The logistic function, with maximum growth rate at time , is the case where .

Generalised logistic differential equation
A particular case of the generalised logistic function is:

which is the solution of the Richards's differential equation (RDE):

with initial condition

where

provided that ν > 0 and α > 0.

The classical logistic differential equation is a particular case of the above equation, with ν =1, whereas the Gompertz curve can be recovered in the limit  provided that:

In fact, for small ν it is

The RDE models many growth phenomena, arising in fields such as oncology and epidemiology.

Gradient of generalized logistic function 
When estimating parameters from data, it is often necessary to compute the partial derivatives of the logistic function with respect to parameters at a given data point  (see).  For the case where ,

Special cases
The following functions are specific cases of Richards's curves:
 Logistic function
 Gompertz curve
 Von Bertalanffy function
 Monomolecular curve

Footnotes

References

Growth curves
Mathematical modeling